Celaleddin Bayazıt (nicknamed Kötürüm Bayazıt) was the bey (lord) of Candaroğlu Beylik an Anatolian beylik from 1361 to 1385. When he was enthroned his beylik had two powerful neighbors; Ottoman Empire in the west and the former Eretnids country under Kadı Burhaneddin in the east. He struggled to keep his land. Besides he also struggled in the Black Sea coastal area against the Republic of Genoa and the Republic of Venice.

The governor of Amasya was his son in law. He supported his son-in-law against Kadı Burhaneddin. In early years he was an ally of the Ottomans. But when his son Süleyman killed İsfendiyar, his other son whom Celaleddin Bayazıt was planning to declare crown prince, Celaleddin Bayazıt defeated his son and Süleyman fled to Ottoman territory. This event marked the end of Candaroğlu –Ottoman alliance. Ottomans supported Süleyman against his father. Süleyman captured Kastamonu from his father in 1383. Although Celaleddin Bayazit recaptured Kastamonu, Ottomans finally annexed Kastamonu in 1384 and Candaroğlu beylik was reduced to a small territory around Sinop. Next year Kötürüm Bayazit died.

References

Turkic rulers
Candaroğlu
History of Kastamonu
14th-century Turkic people
Anatolian beyliks
1385 deaths
History of Sinop, Turkey